Douglas is an unincorporated community in Knox County, Illinois, United States.

History
Clinton L. Ewing (1879–1953), Illinois state legislator, businessman, and farmer, lived with his wife and family in Douglas.

References

Unincorporated communities in Knox County, Illinois
Unincorporated communities in Illinois